Concavenator is an extinct genus of theropod dinosaur that lived approximately 130 million years ago during the early Cretaceous period (Barremian age). The type species is C. corcovatus; Concavenator corcovatus means "Cuenca hunter with a hump". The fossil was discovered in the Las Hoyas fossil site of Spain by paleontologists José Luis Sanz, Francisco Ortega and Fernando Escaso from the Autonomous University of Madrid and the National University of Distance Education.

Description 

It possessed several unique features, including the two extremely tall vertebrae in front of the hips which formed a tall but narrow and pointed crest (possibly supporting a hump) on the dinosaur's back. The function of such crests is currently unknown. Paleontologist Roger Benson from the University of Cambridge speculated that one possibility is that "it is analogous to head-crests used in visual displays", but the Spanish scientists who discovered it noted it could also be a thermal regulator.

Integument 
 
Concavenator had structures resembling quill knobs on its ulna, a feature known only in birds and other feathered theropods, such as Velociraptor. Quill knobs are created by ligaments which attach to the feather follicle, and since scales do not form from follicles, the authors ruled out the possibility that they could indicate the presence of long display scales on the arm. Instead, the knobs have been thought to probably anchor simple, hollow, quill-like structures. Such structures are known both in coelurosaurs such as Dilong and in some ornithischians like Tianyulong and Psittacosaurus. If the ornithischian quills are homologous with bird feathers, their presence in an allosauroid like Concavenator would be expected. However, if ornithischian quills are not related to feathers, the presence of these structures in Concavenator would show that feathers had begun to appear in earlier, more primitive forms than coelurosaurs. 

Feathers or related structures would then likely be present in the first members of the clade Neotetanurae, which lived in the Middle Jurassic. No impressions of any kind of integument were found near the arm, although extensive scale impressions were preserved on other portions of the body, including broad, rectangular scales on the underside of the tail, bird-like scutes on the feet, and plantar pads on the undersides of the feet.

However, the significance of the 'quill knobs' remain controversial, as some amount of skepticism has been raised among experts on the validity of the interpretation that the ulnar bumps represent quill knobs. Christian Foth and colleagues noted that the quill knobs of Concavenator were on the anterolateral side of the ulna, they suggest they were intermuscular lines that acted as tendon attachments. The hypothesis that the bumps along the ulna represented muscular insertion points or ridges was subsequently examined, and the results presented, at the 2015 meeting of the Society of Vertebrate Paleontology. Elena Cuesta Fidalgo, along with two of the researchers who initially described Concavenator (Ortega and Sanz), attempted to reconstruct its forearm musculature to determine if the ulnar bumps would be explained as an inter-muscular ridge. They identified the insertion point for the major arm muscles, and determined that the row of bumps could not have been located between any of them. They found that the only possibility was that the bumps could be an attachment scar for the M. anconeus muscle, which is unlikely, because this muscle normally attaches to a smooth surface without marks or bumps on the underlying bone, and argued that the most likely explanation for the bumps was their initial interpretation as feather quill knobs. The authors admitted that it was unusual for quill knobs to form along the posterolateral surface of the bone, but also noted that the same arrangement is found in some modern birds, like the Moorhen.

 

In 2018, Cuesta Fidalgo published her doctorate thesis on the anatomy of Concavenator which argued that the ulna was preserved in lateral view, meaning that the ulnar bumps were positioned posterolaterally rather than anterolaterally as Cau and Mortimer claimed. Cuesta Fidalgo noted that the proximal part of the ulna is affected by fracturing and abrasion, and certain features would have shifted compared to their position in the bone when the animal was alive. For example, in the fossil, the lateral process of the ulna is positioned further posteriorly than the ulnar bumps. In Allosaurus and Acrocanthosaurus, the lateral process is on the lateral (rather than posterior) part of the bone, which would seem to support the ulnar bumps being anterolateral in position if the lateral process was truly preserved in lateral orientation in Concavenator. However, Cuesta Fidalgo described how the lateral process was distorted posteriorly compared to the bumps, and was not valid evidence for the claim that the ulna had shifted into anterior view. The ulna's distortion (as well as genus-specific proportions) means that precise comparisons to Allosaurus and Acrocanthosaurus would be misleading. As Cuesta Fidalgo and her colleagues explained in 2015, the ulnar bumps could not be an intermuscular line if the bone is preserved in lateral view. Cuesta Fidalgo and her colleagues, they pointed out that these bumps on the ulna are posterolateral which is unlike that of interosseous ligaments.

Classification 

The following cladogram after Novas et al., 2013, shows its place within Carcharodontosauridae.

See also 

 Altispinax
 List of animals with humps

References

External links 
 Concavenator arm bones, with quill knob-like structures visible.

Carcharodontosaurids
Barremian life
Early Cretaceous dinosaurs of Europe
Cretaceous Spain
Fossils of Spain
La Huérguina Formation
Fossil taxa described in 2010